Kate Tyndall (born 12 November 1983) is an Australian rules footballer who played for the Western Bulldogs in the AFL Women's competition. Tyndal was drafted by the Western Bulldogs with their 15th selection and 117th overall in the 2016 AFL Women's draft. She made her debut in the thirty-two point win against  at VU Whitten Oval in the opening round of the 2017 season. She played every match in her debut season to finish with seven games. She was delisted at the conclusion of the 2017 season.

Tyndall lives in Abbotsford, Victoria with her partner, fellow AFLW player Aasta O'Connor.

References

External links 

1983 births
Living people
Western Bulldogs (AFLW) players
Australian rules footballers from Victoria (Australia)
Victorian Women's Football League players
Australian LGBT sportspeople
Lesbian sportswomen
LGBT players of Australian rules football